Rosand is a surname. Notable people with the surname include:

Aaron Rosand (1927–2019), American classical violinist
David Rosand (1938–2014), American art historian, academic, and writer
Ellen Rosand, American musicologist, historian, and opera critic
Jonathan Rosand, American neurologist, scientist, and professor